Ben Haynes (born 27 June 1981) is an Australian rules footballer who played in the Australian Football League (AFL) for  and Essendon Football Clubs and in the South Australian National Football League (SANFL) for West Adelaide Football Club. He also played for Melton South Panthers.

Career
Haynes was rookie-listed at Richmond before his elevation to the main list for the 2000 AFL season. After making his senior debut on 16 July 2000 against Fremantle Football Club at the WACA Ground, Haynes played five games for Richmond before his delistment after the 2001 AFL season.

Essendon added him to their rookie list in 2002 and elevated him to the senior list for the 2003 AFL season. Haynes played 21 games for Essendon, including finals football, and was delisted after the 2005 AFL season.

Haynes joined SANFL club West Adelaide in 2006, winning the club's Best & Fairest award in the same season.

In 2007 Haynes joined YVMDFL 1st Division club Silvan, kicking 119 goals,(including 5 in the Grand Final) alongside ex Essendon teammate Gary Moorcroft who also kicked 119 goals in 2007, leading Silvan to a dominant premiership. In 2008 Haynes took over the senior coaching role at Silvan, leading the club to an undefeated season, and securing the club's first back to back premierships.  After stepping down from his coaching role at Silvan at the end of 2009, Haynes joined Maribyrnong Park, where he played a pivotal role in securing the Lion's first ever back-to-back 1st Division premierships. In difficult conditions, Haynes was a clear standout in the Grand Final, and was awarded the Best on Ground Medal for his dominate performance. 
In 2011 Haynes joined the Montmorency Football Club in the Northern Football League, where he played out his remaining years, unfortunately not adding to his premiership tally.

Coaching and personal life
After retiring from playing at the end of the 2015 season, Haynes was appointed senior coach at Montmorency, where he led the Magpies from 2016 to 2018, after which Haynes remained involved at Montmorency in various off-field roles.
Haynes is now enjoying life, post football, with wife Jenelle and their three young children.

External links

The Age 5 September 2003 Haynes has come full circle

Richmond Football Club players
Essendon Football Club players
1981 births
Living people
Australian rules footballers from Victoria (Australia)
Western Jets players
Montmorency Football Club players
West Adelaide Football Club players
Melton South Football Club players